The Silvermine River is an  river that flows through the towns of Norwalk, Wilton and New Canaan, Connecticut.  It is spanned by the 1899 Perry Avenue Bridge in the Silvermine neighborhood, and by the Silvermine River Bridge that carries the Merritt Parkway.  It is a tributary of the Norwalk River which it joins at the north end of Deering Pond.

See also
List of rivers of Connecticut

References

Rivers of Fairfield County, Connecticut
Rivers of Connecticut